The 1801 Tennessee gubernatorial election took place from August 6–7, 1801. The incumbent governor, John Sevier, had reached his three consecutive term limit and had to wait until 1803 to run again. Democratic-Republican judge Archibald Roane won a term almost unanimously against scattering opponents.

Results

References

1801 Tennessee elections
1801
Tennessee